The Laser 5000 is a double-handed, dual trapeze skiff with an asymmetrical spinnaker . It derives its name from its length of  5 metres. Losing out to the Bethwaite-designed 49er for selection as an Olympic class for the 2000 Games, it was one of 11 designs that took part in the ISAF High Performance Olympic Dinghy Evaluation Event in 1996.

It was designed in the early 1990s by Phil Morrison.  The design was informed by Morrison's earlier experimental Gemini design he had designed and built with Bill Twine and Nick Lightbody in Berwick, East Sussex in 1979. The class is strongest in the UK and Europe with over 200 boats built and a televised European circuit.

References

External links
Class Association Website
National Racing Dinghy Archive. History of Laser 5000 development and design.

Dinghies
1990s sailboat type designs
Boats designed by Phil Morrison
Sailboat types built by LaserPerformance